Firuzabad District may refer to:

 Firuzabad District (Kermanshah Province), Iran.
 Firuzabad District (Selseleh County), Lorestan province, Iran
 Firuzabad Rural District, Lorestan province, Iran
 Firuzabad District (Chaharborj County), West Azerbaijan province